Anales de Física was a peer-reviewed scientific journal covering research in all areas of physics published by the Royal Spanish Society of Physics (Real Sociedad Española de Física). It continued Anales de la Real Sociedad Española de Física y Química/Serie A, Física and its first independent title was:

From 1981 (vol. 77 (1981) to Vol. 87 (1992) the journal was split in two sections:

 Anales de Física/Serie A, Fenómenos e Interacciones (CODEN: AFAIDU),
 Anales de Física/Serie B, Aplicaciones, Métodos e Instrumentos (CODEN: AFBIDZ).

Finally, the journal was renamed to

Publication ceased after issue no. 2, 1998, when the journal was merged with several other European journals in the European Physical Journal. The Royal Spanish Society of Physics is now publishing two other journals entitled Revista Española de Física and Revista Iberoamericana de Física.

External links 
 Royal Spanish Society of Physics

Physics journals
Publications established in 1968
Publications disestablished in 1998
Multilingual journals
Defunct journals